Vegetarianism is the practice of abstaining from the consumption of meat (red meat, poultry, seafood, insects, and the flesh of any other animal). It may also include abstaining from eating all by-products of animal slaughter.

Vegetarianism may be adopted for various reasons. Many people object to eating meat out of respect for sentient animal life. Such ethical motivations have been codified under various religious beliefs as well as animal rights advocacy. Other motivations for vegetarianism are health-related, political, environmental, cultural, aesthetic, economic, taste-related, or relate to other personal preferences.

There are many variations of the vegetarian diet: an ovo-lacto vegetarian diet includes both eggs and dairy products, an ovo-vegetarian diet includes eggs but not dairy products, and a lacto-vegetarian diet includes dairy products but not eggs. As the strictest of vegetarian diets, a vegan diet excludes all animal products, and can be accompanied by abstention from the use of animal-derived products, such as leather shoes.

Maintenance of a vegetarian diet can be challenging. While avoidance of animal products may support health and ethical concerns, dietary supplements may be needed to prevent nutritional deficiency if all such products are shunned, particularly for vitamin B12. Packaged and processed foods may contain minor quantities of animal ingredients. While some vegetarians scrutinize product labels for such ingredients, others do not object to consuming them, or are unaware of their presence.

Origin
The first written use of the term "vegetarian" originated in the early 19th century, when authors referred to a vegetable regimen diet. Historically, 'vegetable' could be used to refer to any type of edible vegetation. Modern dictionaries explain its origin as a compound of vegetable (adjective) and the suffix -arian (in the sense of agrarian). The term was popularized with the foundation of the Vegetarian Society in Manchester in 1847, although it may have appeared in print before 1847. The earliest occurrences of the term seem to be related to Alcott House—a school on the north side of Ham Common, London—which was opened in July 1838 by James Pierrepont Greaves. From 1841, it was known as A Concordium, or Industry Harmony College, from which time the institution began to publish its own pamphlet entitled The Healthian, which provides some of the earliest appearances of the term "vegetarian".

History

The earliest record of vegetarianism comes from the 9th century BCE, inculcating tolerance towards all living beings. Parshwanatha and Mahavira, the 23rd and 24th tirthankaras in Jainism, respectively, revived and advocated ahimsa and Jain vegetarianism between the 8th and 6th centuries BCE; the most comprehensive and strictest form of vegetarianism. In Indian culture, vegetarianism has been closely connected with the attitude of nonviolence towards animals (called ahimsa in India) for millennia and was promoted by religious groups and philosophers. The Acharanga Sutra from 5th century BCE advocates Jain-vegetarianism; and forbids the monks from walking on grass in order to avoid inflicting pain on them and prevent small insects dwelling inside from getting killed. 

The ancient Indian work of Tirukkural, dated before 5th century CE, explicitly and unambiguously emphasizes shunning meat and non-killing as a common man's virtues. Chapter 26 of the Tirukkural, particularly couplets 251–260, deals exclusively on vegetarianism or veganism.

Among the Hellenes, Egyptians, and others, vegetarianism had medical or ritual purification purposes. Vegetarianism was also practiced in ancient Greece and the earliest reliable evidence for vegetarian theory and practice in Greece dates from the 6th century BCE. The Orphics, a religious movement spreading in Greece at that time, also practiced and promoted vegetarianism. Greek teacher Pythagoras, who promoted the altruistic doctrine of metempsychosis, may have practiced vegetarianism, but is also recorded as eating meat. A fictionalized portrayal of Pythagoras appears in Ovid's Metamorphoses, in which he advocates a form of strict vegetarianism. It was through this portrayal that Pythagoras was best known to English-speakers throughout the early modern period and, prior to the coinage of the word "vegetarianism", vegetarians were referred to in English as "Pythagoreans". Vegetarianism was also practiced about six centuries later in another instance (30 BCE–50 CE) in the northern Thracian region by the Moesi tribe (who inhabited present-day Serbia and Bulgaria), feeding themselves on honey, milk, and cheese.

In Japan in 675, the Emperor Tenmu prohibited the killing and the eating of meat during the busy farming period between April and September but excluded the eating of wild birds and wild animals. These bans and several others that followed over the centuries were overturned in the nineteenth century during the Meiji Restoration. In China, during the Song Dynasty, Buddhist cuisine became popular enough that vegetarian restaurants appeared where chefs used ingredients such as beans, gluten, root vegetables and mushrooms to create meat analogues including pork, fowl, eggs and crab roe and many meat substitutes used even today such as tofu, seitan and konjac originate in Chinese Buddhist cuisine.

Following the Christianization of the Roman Empire in late antiquity, vegetarianism practically disappeared from Europe, as it did elsewhere, except in India. Several orders of monks in medieval Europe restricted or banned the consumption of meat for ascetic reasons, but none of them eschewed fish. Moreover, the medieval definition of "fish" included such animals as seals, porpoises, dolphins, barnacle geese, puffins, and beavers. Vegetarianism re-emerged during the Renaissance, becoming more widespread in the 19th and 20th centuries. In 1847, the first Vegetarian Society was founded in the United Kingdom; Germany, the Netherlands, and other countries followed. In 1886, the vegetarian colony Nueva Germania was founded in Paraguay, though its vegetarian aspect would prove short-lived. The International Vegetarian Union, an association of the national societies, was founded in 1908. In the Western world, the popularity of vegetarianism grew during the 20th century as a result of nutritional, ethical, and—more recently—environmental and economic concerns.

Varieties

 

There are a number of vegetarian diets that exclude or include various foods:

 Fruitarianism permits only fruit, nuts, seeds, and other plant matter that can be gathered without harming the plant.
 Macrobiotic diets consist mostly of whole grains and beans.
 Lacto vegetarianism includes dairy products but not eggs.
 Ovo vegetarianism includes eggs but not dairy products.
 Ovo-lacto vegetarianism (or lacto-ovo vegetarianism) includes animal products such as eggs, milk, and honey.
 Sattvic diet (also known as yogic diet), a plant-based diet which may also include dairy and honey, but excludes eggs, red lentils, durian, mushrooms, alliums, blue cheeses, fermented foods or sauces, and alcoholic drinks. Coffee, black or green tea, chocolate, nutmeg, and any other type of stimulant (including excessively pungent spices) are sometimes excluded, as well.
 Veganism excludes all animal flesh and by-products, such as eggs, milk, honey (not always), and items refined or manufactured through any such product, such as animal-tested baking soda or white sugar refined with bone char.
 Raw veganism includes only fresh and uncooked fruit, nuts, seeds, and vegetables. Food must not be heated above  to be considered "raw". Usually, raw vegan food is only ever "cooked" with a food dehydrator at low temperatures.
Within the "ovo-" groups, there are many who refuse to consume fertilized eggs (with balut being an extreme example); however, such distinction is typically not specifically addressed.

Some vegetarians also avoid products that may use animal ingredients not included in their labels or which use animal products in their manufacturing. For example, sugars that are whitened with bone char, cheeses that use animal rennet (enzymes from animal stomach lining), gelatin (derived from the collagen inside animals' skin, bones, and connective tissue), some cane sugar (but not beet sugar) and beverages (such as apple juice and alcohol) clarified with gelatin or crushed shellfish and sturgeon, while other vegetarians are unaware of, or do not mind, such ingredients. In the 21st century, 90% of rennet and chymosin used in cheesemaking are derived from industrial fermentation processes, which satisfy both kosher and halal requirements.

Individuals sometimes label themselves "vegetarian" while practicing a semi-vegetarian diet, as some dictionary definitions describe vegetarianism as sometimes including the consumption of fish, or only include mammalian flesh as part of their definition of meat, while other definitions exclude fish and all animal flesh. In other cases, individuals may describe themselves as "flexitarian".
These diets may be followed by those who reduce animal flesh consumed as a way of transitioning to a complete vegetarian diet or for health, ethical, environmental, or other reasons. Semi-vegetarian diets include:
 Pescetarianism, which includes fish and possibly other forms of seafood.
 Pollotarianism, which includes chicken and possibly other poultry.

Semi-vegetarianism is contested by vegetarian groups, such as the Vegetarian Society, which states that vegetarianism excludes all animal flesh.

Consumption of eggs is not considered to be a part of a vegetarian diet in India, as egg is an animal product that gives birth to the next generation of the relevant species.

Health research 

In Western countries, the most common motive for people practicing vegetarianism is health consciousness. The American Dietetic Association has stated that at all stages of life, a properly planned vegetarian diet can be "healthful, nutritionally adequate, and may be beneficial in the prevention and treatment of certain diseases." Vegetarian diets offer lower levels of saturated fat, cholesterol and animal protein, and higher levels of carbohydrates, fibre, magnesium, potassium, folate, vitamins C and E, and phytochemicals.

Bones 
Studies have shown that a vegetarian diet may increase the risk of calcium deficiency and low bone mineral density. A 2019 review found that vegetarians have lower bone mineral density at the femoral neck and lumbar spine compared to omnivores. A 2020 meta-analysis found that infants fed a vegetarian diet containing milk and dairy products exhibit normal growth and development. A 2021 review found no differences in growth between vegetarian and meat-eating children.

Diabetes 
Vegetarian diets are under preliminary research for their potential to help people with type 2 diabetes.

Cardiovascular system 
Meta-analyses have reported a reduced risk of death from ischemic heart disease and from cerebrovascular disease among vegetarians.

Mental health
Reviews of vegan and vegetarian diets showed a possible association with depression and anxiety, particularly among people under 26 years old. Another review found no significant associations between a vegetarian diet and depression or anxiety.

Eating disorders
The American Dietetic Association discussed that vegetarian diets may be more common among adolescents with eating disorders, indicating that vegetarian diets do not cause eating disorders, but rather "vegetarian diets may be selected to camouflage an existing eating disorder".

Mortality risk
A 2012 study found a reduced risk in all-cause mortality in vegetarians. A 2017 review found a lower mortality (-25%) from ischemic heart disease.

Diet composition and nutrition

Western vegetarian diets are typically high in carotenoids, but relatively low in omega-3 fatty acids and vitamin B12. Vegans can have particularly low intake of vitamin B and calcium if they do not eat enough items such as collard greens, leafy greens, tempeh and tofu (soy). High levels of dietary fiber, folic acid, vitamins C and E, and magnesium, and low consumption of saturated fat are all considered to be beneficial aspects of a vegetarian diet. A well planned vegetarian diet will provide all nutrients in a meat-eater's diet to the same level for all stages of life.

Protein
Protein intake in vegetarian diets tends to be lower than in meat diets but can meet the daily requirements for most people. Studies at Harvard University as well as other studies conducted in the United States, United Kingdom, Canada, Australia, New Zealand, and various European countries,
confirmed vegetarian diets provide sufficient protein intake as long as a variety of plant sources are available and consumed.

Iron
Vegetarian diets typically contain similar levels of iron to non-vegetarian diets, but this has lower bioavailability than iron from meat sources, and its absorption can sometimes be inhibited by other dietary constituents. According to the Vegetarian Resource Group, consuming food that contains vitamin C, such as citrus fruit or juices, tomatoes, or broccoli, is a good way to increase the amount of iron absorbed at a meal. Vegetarian foods rich in iron include black beans, cashews, hempseed, kidney beans, broccoli, lentils, oatmeal, raisins, jaggery, spinach, cabbage, lettuce, black-eyed peas, soybeans, many breakfast cereals, sunflower seeds, chickpeas, tomato juice, tempeh, molasses, thyme, and whole-wheat bread. The related vegan diets can often be higher in iron than vegetarian diets, because dairy products are low in iron. Iron stores often tend to be lower in vegetarians than non-vegetarians, and a few small studies report very high rates of iron deficiency (up to 40%, and 58% of the respective vegetarian or vegan groups). However, the American Dietetic Association states that iron deficiency is no more common in vegetarians than non-vegetarians (adult males are rarely iron deficient); iron deficiency anaemia is rare no matter the diet.

Vitamin B12
Vitamin B12 is not generally present in plants but is naturally found in foods of animal origin. Lacto-ovo vegetarians can obtain B12 from dairy products and eggs, and vegans can obtain it from manufactured fortified foods (including plant-based products and breakfast cereals) and dietary supplements. A strict vegan diet avoiding consumption of all animal products risks vitamin B12 deficiency, which can lead to hyperhomocysteinemia, a risk factor for several health disorders, including anemia, neurological deficits, gastrointestinal problems, platelet disorders, and increased risk for cardiovascular diseases. The recommended daily dietary intake of B12 in the United States and Canada is 0.4 mcg (ages 0–6 months), rising to 1.8 mcg (9–13 years), 2.4 mcg (14+ years), and 2.8 mcg (lactating female). While the body's daily requirement for vitamin B12 is in microgram amounts, deficiency of the vitamin through strict practice of a vegetarian diet without supplementation can increase the risk of several chronic diseases.

Fatty acids
Plant-based, or vegetarian, sources of Omega 3 fatty acids include soy, walnuts, pumpkin seeds, canola oil, kiwifruit, hempseed, algae, chia seed, flaxseed, echium seed and leafy vegetables such as lettuce, spinach, cabbage and purslane. Purslane contains more Omega 3 than any other known leafy green. Olives (and olive oil) are another important plant source of unsaturated fatty acids. Plant foods can provide alpha-linolenic acid which the human body uses to synthesize the long-chain n-3 fatty acids EPA and DHA. EPA and DHA can be obtained directly in high amounts from oily fish or fish oils. Vegetarians, and particularly vegans, have lower levels of EPA and DHA than meat-eaters. While the health effects of low levels of EPA and DHA are unknown, it is unlikely that supplementation with alpha-linolenic acid will significantly increase levels. Recently, some companies have begun to market vegetarian DHA supplements containing seaweed extracts. Whole seaweeds are not suitable for supplementation because their high iodine content limits the amount that may be safely consumed. However, certain algae such as spirulina are good sources of gamma-linolenic acid (GLA), alpha-linolenic acid (ALA), linoleic acid (LA), stearidonic acid (SDA), eicosapentaenoic acid (EPA), docosahexaenoic acid (DHA), and arachidonic acid (AA).

Calcium
Calcium intake in vegetarians and vegans can be similar to non-vegetarians, as long as the diet is properly planned. Lacto-ovo vegetarians that include dairy products can still obtain calcium from dairy sources like milk, yogurt, and cheese.

Non-dairy milks that are fortified with calcium, such as soymilk and almond milk can also contribute a significant amount of calcium in the diet. Broccoli, bok choy, and kale have also been found to have calcium that is well absorbed in the body. Though the calcium content per serving is lower in these vegetables than a glass of milk, the absorption of the calcium into the body is higher. Other foods that contain calcium include calcium-set tofu, blackstrap molasses, turnip greens, mustard greens, soybeans, tempeh, almonds, okra, dried figs, and tahini. Though calcium can be found in Spinach, swiss chard, beans and beet greens, they are generally not considered to be a good source since the calcium binds to oxalic acid and is poorly absorbed into the body. Phytic acid found in nuts, seeds, and beans may also impact calcium absorption rates. See the National Institutes of Health Office of Dietary Supplements for calcium needs for various ages, the Vegetarian Resource Group and the Vegetarian Nutrition Calcium Fact Sheet from the Academy of Nutrition and Dietetics for more specifics on how to obtain adequate calcium intake on a vegetarian or vegan diet.

Vitamin D

Vitamin D needs can be met via the human body's own generation upon sufficient and sensible exposure to ultraviolet (UV) light in sunlight. Products including milk, soy milk and cereal grains may be fortified to provide a source of vitamin D. For those who do not get adequate sun exposure or food sources, vitamin D supplementation may be necessary.

Vitamin D2
 Plants
 Alfalfa (Medicago sativa subsp. sativa), shoot: 4.8 μg (192 IU) vitamin D2, 0.1 μg (4 IU) vitamin D3
 Fungus, from USDA nutrient database, per 100 g:
 Mushrooms, portabella, exposed to ultraviolet light, raw: Vitamin D2: 11.2 μg (446 IU)
 Mushrooms, portabella, exposed to ultraviolet light, grilled: Vitamin D2: 13.1 μg (524 IU)
 Mushrooms, shiitake, dried: Vitamin D2: 3.9 μg (154 IU)
 Mushrooms, shiitake, raw: Vitamin D2: 0.4 μg (18 IU)
 Mushrooms, portabella, raw: Vitamin D2: 0.3 μg (10 IU)
 Mushroom powder, any species, illuminated with sunlight or artificial ultraviolet light sources

Vitamin D2, or ergocalciferol is found in fungus (except alfalfa which is a plantae) and created from viosterol, which in turn is created when ultraviolet light activates ergosterol (which is found in fungi and named as a sterol from ergot). Any UV-irradiated fungus including yeast form vitamin D2. Human bioavailability of vitamin D2 from vitamin D2-enhanced button mushrooms via UV-B irradiation is effective in improving vitamin D status and not different from a vitamin D2 supplement according to study. For example, vitamin D2 from UV-irradiated yeast baked into bread is bioavailable.
By visual assessment or using a chromometer, no significant discoloration of irradiated mushrooms, as measured by the degree of "whiteness", was observed making it hard to discover if they have been treated without labeling. Claims have been made that a normal serving (approx. 3 oz or 1/2 cup, or 60 grams) of mushrooms treated with ultraviolet light increase their vitamin D content to levels up to 80 micrograms, or 2700 IU if exposed to just 5 minutes of UV light after being harvested.

Choline

Choline is a nutrient that helps transfer signals between nerve cells and is involved in liver function. It is highest in dairy foods and meat but it is possible to be obtained through a vegan diet.

Ethics and diet

General

With regard to the ethics of eating meat, scholars consider vegetarianism an ideology and a social movement. Ethical reasons for choosing vegetarianism vary and are usually predicated on the interests of non-human animals. In many societies, controversy and debate have arisen over the ethics of eating animals. Some people, while not vegetarians, refuse to eat the flesh of certain animals due to cultural taboo, such as cats, dogs, horses or rabbits. Others support meat eating for scientific, nutritional and cultural reasons, including religious ones. Some meat eaters abstain from the meat of animals reared in particular ways, such as factory farms, or avoid certain meats, such as veal or foie gras. Some people follow vegetarian or vegan diets not because of moral concerns involving the raising or consumption of animals in general, but because of concerns about the specific treatment and practices involved in the processing of animals for food. Others still avoid meat out of concern that meat production places a greater burden on the environment than production of an equivalent amount of plant protein. Ethical objections based on consideration for animals are generally divided into opposition to the act of killing in general, and opposition to certain agricultural practices surrounding the production of meat.

Ethics of killing for food 

Ethical vegetarians believe that killing an animal, like killing a human, especially one who has equal or lesser cognitive abilities than the animals in question, can only be justified in extreme circumstances and that consuming a living creature for its enjoyable taste, convenience, or nutrition value is not a sufficient cause. Another common view is that humans are morally conscious of their behavior in a way other animals are not, and therefore subject to higher standards. Jeff McMahan proposes that denying the right to life and humane treatment to animals with equal or greater cognitive abilities than mentally disabled humans is an arbitrary and discriminatory practice based on habit instead of logic. Opponents of ethical vegetarianism argue that animals are not moral equals to humans and so consider the comparison of eating livestock with killing people to be fallacious. This view does not excuse cruelty, but maintains that animals do not possess the rights a human has.

Dairy and eggs 
One of the main differences between a vegan and a lacto-ovo vegetarian diet is the avoidance of both eggs and dairy products such as milk, cheese, butter and yogurt. Ethical vegans do not consume dairy or eggs because they state that their production causes the animal suffering or a premature death.

To produce milk from dairy cattle, farmers separate calves from their mothers soon after birth to retain cow milk for human consumption.

Treatment of animals 

Ethical vegetarianism has become popular in developed countries particularly because of the spread of factory farming, faster communications, and environmental consciousness. Some believe that the current mass-demand for meat cannot be satisfied without a mass-production system that disregards the welfare of animals, while others believe that practices like well-managed free-range farming or the consumption of game (particularly from species whose natural predators have been significantly eliminated) could substantially alleviate consumer demand for mass-produced meat.

Religion and diet

Jainism teaches vegetarianism as moral conduct, as do some sects of Hinduism. Buddhism in general does not prohibit meat eating, but Mahayana Buddhism encourages vegetarianism as beneficial for developing compassion. Other denominations that advocate a vegetarian diet include the Seventh-day Adventists, the Rastafari movement, the Ananda Marga movement and the Hare Krishnas. Sikhism does not equate spirituality with diet and does not specify a vegetarian or meat diet.

Baháʼí Faith
While there are no dietary restrictions in the Baháʼí Faith, `Abdu'l-Bahá, the son of the religion's founder, noted that a vegetarian diet consisting of fruits and grains was desirable, except for people with a weak constitution or those that are sick. He stated that there are no requirements that Baháʼís become vegetarian, but that a future society should gradually become vegetarian. `Abdu'l-Bahá also stated that killing animals was contrary to compassion. While Shoghi Effendi, the head of the Bahá'í Faith in the first half of the 20th century, stated that a purely vegetarian diet would be preferable since it avoided killing animals, both he and the Universal House of Justice, the governing body of the Baháʼís have stated that these teachings do not constitute a Baháʼí practice and that Baháʼís can choose to eat whatever they wish but should be respectful of others' beliefs.

Buddhism

Theravadins in general eat meat. If Buddhist monks "see, hear or know" a living animal was killed specifically for them to eat, they must refuse it or else incur an offense. However, this does not include eating meat which was given as alms or commercially purchased. In the Theravada canon, Buddha did not make any comment discouraging them from eating meat (except specific types, such as human, elephant, horse, dog, snake, lion, tiger, leopard, bear, and hyena flesh) but he specifically refused to institute vegetarianism in his monastic code when a suggestion had been made.

In several Sanskrit texts of Mahayana Buddhism, Buddha instructs his followers to avoid meat. However, each branch of Mahayana Buddhism selects which sutra to follow, and some branches, including the majority of Tibetan and Japanese Buddhists, actually do eat meat.

Meanwhile, Chinese, Korean, Vietnamese Buddhism (in some sectors of East Asian Buddhism) monks and nuns are expected to abstain from meat and, traditionally,  to abstain from eggs and dairy as well.

Different Buddhist traditions have differing teachings on diet, which may also vary for ordained monks and nuns compared to others. Many interpret the precept "not to kill" to require abstinence from meat, but not all. In Taiwan, su vegetarianism excludes not only all animal products but also vegetables in the allium family (which have the characteristic aroma of onion and garlic): onion, garlic, scallions, leeks, chives, or shallots.

Christianity

Various groups within Christianity have practiced specific dietary restrictions for various reasons. The Council of Jerusalem in around 50 AD, recommended Christians keep following some of the Jewish food laws concerning meat. The early sect known as the Ebionites are considered to have practiced vegetarianism. Surviving fragments from their Gospel indicate their belief that – as Christ is the Passover sacrifice and eating the Passover lamb is no longer required – a vegetarian diet may (or should) be observed. However, orthodox Christianity does not accept their teaching as authentic. Indeed, their specific injunction to strict vegetarianism was cited as one of the Ebionites' "errors".

At a much later time, the Bible Christian Church founded by Reverend William Cowherd in 1809 followed a vegetarian diet. Cowherd was one of the philosophical forerunners of the Vegetarian Society. Cowherd encouraged members to abstain from eating of meat as a form of temperance.

Seventh-day Adventists are encouraged to engage in healthy eating practices, and ovo-lacto-vegetarian diets are recommended by the General Conference of Seventh-day Adventists Nutrition Council (GCNC). They have also sponsored and participated in many scientific studies exploring the impact of dietary decisions upon health outcomes. The GCNC has in addition adapted the USDA's food pyramid for a vegetarian dietary approach. However, the only kinds of meat specifically frowned upon by the SDA health message are unclean meats, or those forbidden in scripture.

Additionally, some monastic orders follow a pescatarian diet, and members of the Eastern Orthodox Church follow a vegan diet during fasts. There is also a strong association between the Quakers and vegetarianism dating back at least to the 18th century. The association grew in prominence during the 19th century, coupled with growing Quaker concerns in connection with alcohol consumption, anti-vivisection and social purity. The association between the Quaker tradition and vegetarianism, however, becomes most significant with the founding of the Friends' Vegetarian Society in 1902 "to spread a kindlier way of living amongst the Society of Friends."

Seventh-day Adventist
Since the formation of the Seventh-day Adventist Church in the 1860s when the church began, wholeness and health have been an emphasis of the Adventist church, and has been known as the "health message" belief of the church. Adventists are well known for presenting a health message that recommends vegetarianism and expects adherence to the kosher laws in Leviticus 11. Obedience to these laws means abstinence from pork, shellfish, and other animals proscribed as "unclean". The church discourages its members from consuming alcoholic beverages, tobacco or illegal drugs (compare Christianity and alcohol). In addition, some Adventists avoid coffee, tea, cola, and other beverages containing caffeine.

The pioneers of the Adventist Church had much to do with the common acceptance of breakfast cereals into the Western diet, and the "modern commercial concept of cereal food" originated among Adventists. John Harvey Kellogg was one of the early founders of Adventist health work. His development of breakfast cereals as a health food led to the founding of Kellogg's by his brother William. In both Australia and New Zealand, the church-owned Sanitarium Health and Wellbeing Company is a leading manufacturer of health and vegetarian-related products, most prominently Weet-Bix.

Research funded by the U.S. National Institutes of Health has shown that the average Adventist in California lives 4 to 10 years longer than the average Californian. The research, as cited by the cover story of the November 2005 issue of National Geographic, asserts that Adventists live longer because they do not smoke or drink alcohol, have a day of rest every week, and maintain a healthy, low-fat vegetarian diet that is rich in nuts and beans. The cohesiveness of Adventists' social networks has also been put forward as an explanation for their extended lifespan.
Since Dan Buettner's 2005 National Geographic story about Adventist longevity, his book, The Blue Zones: Lessons for Living Longer From the People Who've Lived the Longest, named Loma Linda, California a "blue zone" because of the large concentration of Seventh-day Adventists. He cites the Adventist emphasis on health, diet, and Sabbath-keeping as primary factors for Adventist longevity.

An estimated 35% of Adventists practice vegetarianism or veganism, according to a 2002 worldwide survey of local church leaders. North American Adventist health study recruitments from 2001 to 2007 found a similar prevalence of vegetarianism/veganism. A small majority of Adventists, 54%, were conventional meat-eaters. Of the remaining 46% it was found that 28% were Ovo/Lacto-vegetarians, 10% were Pesco-vegetarians and 8% were vegans. It is common for Adventists who choose to eat meat to follow highly vegetarian diets; 6% of the "meat-eaters" group restricted their intake of meat/fish to no more than once per week.

Hinduism

Though there is no strict rule on what to consume and what not to, the food habits of Hindus vary according to their community, location, custom and varying traditions. Historically and currently, a majority of Hindus eat meat.

Some sects of Hinduism follow vegetarianism as an ideal. The reasons stated by them are: the principle of nonviolence (ahimsa) applied to animals; the intention to offer only "pure" (vegetarian) food to a deity and then to receive it back as prasad; and the conviction that a satvic diet is beneficial for a healthy body. A sattvic diet is lacto-vegetarian where it can include dairy, but excludes eggs. A section of Hindus consider the cow as a holy animal whose slaughter for meat is forbidden.

Islam

Some followers of Islam, or Muslims, chose to be vegetarian for health, ethical, or personal reasons. However, the choice to become vegetarian for non-medical reasons can sometimes be controversial due to conflicting fatwas and differing interpretations of the Quran. Though some more traditional Muslims may keep quiet about their vegetarian diet, the number of vegetarian Muslims is increasing.

Sri Lankan Sufi master Bawa Muhaiyaddeen, who established The Bawa Muhaiyaddeen Fellowship of North America in Philadelphia. The former Indian president Dr. A. P. J. Abdul Kalam was also famously a vegetarian.

In January 1996, The International Vegetarian Union announced the formation of the Muslim Vegetarian/Vegan Society.

Many non-vegetarian Muslims will select vegetarian (or seafood) options when dining in non-halal restaurants. However, this is a matter of not having the right kind of meat rather than preferring not to eat meat on the whole.

Jainism

Followers of Jainism believe that all living organisms, including microorganisms, are living and have a soul, and have one or more senses out of five senses. They go to great lengths to minimise any harm to any living organism. Most Jains are lacto-vegetarians, but more devout Jains do not eat root vegetables, because they believe that root vegetables contain many more microorganisms as compared to other vegetables, and that, by eating them, violence against these microorganisms is inevitable. They therefore prefer eating beans and fruits, whose cultivation involves killing fewer microorganisms. No products obtained from already-dead animals are allowed because of potential violence against decomposing microorganisms. Some particularly dedicated individuals are fruitarians. Honey is forbidden, being the regurgitation of nectar by bees  and potentially containing eggs, excreta and dead bees. Many Jains do not consume plant parts that grow underground such as roots and bulbs, because the plants themselves and tiny animals may be killed when the plants are pulled up.

Judaism

While classical Jewish law neither requires nor prohibits the consumption of meat, Jewish vegetarians often cite Jewish principles regarding animal welfare, environmental ethics, moral character, and health as reasons for adopting a vegetarian or vegan diet.

Rabbis may advocate vegetarianism or veganism primarily because of concerns about animal welfare, especially in light of the traditional prohibition on causing unnecessary "pain to living creatures" (tza'ar ba'alei hayyim). Some Jewish vegetarian groups and activists believe that the halakhic permission to eat meat is a temporary leniency for those who are not ready yet to accept the vegetarian diet.

The book of Daniel starts in its first chapter with the benefits of vegetarianism. Due to its size, its late time of origin and its revealing content, the book is of particular importance for the time of the following exile, which lasts now for 2000 years and technically still goes on until the Temple in Jerusalem is rebuilt. A diet described as "pulse and water" is presented along benefits such as accordance with the biblical dietary laws, health, beauty, wisdom and visions. Vegetarianism can be seen as a safeguard around the dietary laws or the beautification of them.

Jewish vegetarianism and veganism have become especially popular among Israeli Jews. In 2016, Israel was described as "the most vegan country on Earth", as five percent of its population eschewed all animal products. Interest in veganism has grown among both non-Orthodox and Orthodox Jews in Israel.

Rastafari
Within the Afro-Caribbean community, a minority are Rastafari and follow the dietary regulations with varying degrees of strictness. The most orthodox eat only "Ital" or natural foods, in which the matching of herbs or spices with vegetables is the result of long tradition originating from the African ancestry and cultural heritage of Rastafari. "Ital", which is derived from the word vital, means essential to human existence. Ital cooking in its strictest form prohibits the use of salt, meat (especially pork), preservatives, colorings, flavorings and anything artificial. Most Rastafari are vegetarian.

Sikhism

The tenets of Sikhism do not advocate a particular stance on either vegetarianism or the consumption of meat, but leave the decision of diet to the individual. The tenth guru, Guru Gobind Singh, however, prohibited "Amritdhari" Sikhs, or those that follow the Sikh Rehat Maryada (the Official Sikh Code of Conduct) from eating Kutha meat, or meat which has been obtained from animals which have been killed in a ritualistic way. This is understood to have been for the political reason of maintaining independence from the then-new Muslim hegemony, as Muslims largely adhere to the ritualistic halal diet.

"Amritdharis" that belong to some Sikh sects (e.g. Akhand Kirtani Jatha, Damdami Taksal, Namdhari and Rarionwalay, etc.) are vehemently against the consumption of meat and eggs (though they do consume and encourage the consumption of milk, butter and cheese). This vegetarian stance has been traced back to the times of the British Raj, with the advent of many new Vaishnava converts. In response to the varying views on diet throughout the Sikh population, Sikh Gurus have sought to clarify the Sikh view on diet, stressing their preference only for simplicity of diet. Guru Nanak said that over-consumption of food (Lobh, Greed) involves a drain on the Earth's resources and thus on life. Passages from the Guru Granth Sahib (the holy book of Sikhs, also known as the Adi Granth) say that it is "foolish" to argue for the superiority of animal life, because though all life is related, only human life carries more importance: "Only fools argue whether to eat meat or not. Who can define what is meat and what is not meat? Who knows where the sin lies, being a vegetarian or a non-vegetarian?" The Sikh langar, or free temple meal, is largely lacto-vegetarian, though this is understood to be a result of efforts to present a meal that is respectful of the diets of any person who would wish to dine, rather than out of dogma.

Environment and diet

Environmental vegetarianism is based on the concern that the production of meat and animal products for mass consumption, especially through factory farming, is environmentally unsustainable. According to a 2006 United Nations initiative, the livestock industry is one of the largest contributors to environmental degradation worldwide, and modern practices of raising animals for food contribute on a "massive scale" to air and water pollution, land degradation, climate change, and loss of biodiversity. The initiative concluded that "the livestock sector emerges as one of the top two or three most significant contributors to the most serious environmental problems, at every scale from local to global."

In addition, animal agriculture is a large source of greenhouse gases. According to a 2006 report it is responsible for 18% of the world's greenhouse gas emissions as estimated in 100-year CO2 equivalents. Livestock sources (including enteric fermentation and manure) account for about 3.1 percent of US anthropogenic GHG emissions expressed as carbon dioxide equivalents. This EPA estimate is based on methodologies agreed to by the Conference of Parties of the UNFCCC, with 100-year global warming potentials from the IPCC Second Assessment Report used in estimating GHG emissions as carbon dioxide equivalents.

Meat produced in a laboratory (called in vitro meat) may be more environmentally sustainable than regularly produced meat. Reactions of vegetarians vary. Rearing a relatively small number of grazing animals can be beneficial, as the Food Climate Research Network at Surrey University reports: "A little bit of livestock production is probably a good thing for the environment".

In May 2009, Ghent, Belgium, was reported to be "the first [city] in the world to go vegetarian at least once a week" for environmental reasons, when local authorities decided to implement a "weekly meatless day". Civil servants would eat vegetarian meals one day per week, in recognition of the United Nations' report. Posters were put up by local authorities to encourage the population to take part on vegetarian days, and "veggie street maps" were printed to highlight vegetarian restaurants. In September 2009, schools in Ghent are due to have a weekly veggiedag ("vegetarian day") too.

Public opinion and acceptance of meat-free food is expected to be more successful if its descriptive words focus less on the health aspects and more on the flavor.

Labor conditions and diet
Some groups, such as PETA, promote vegetarianism as a way to offset poor treatment and working conditions of workers in the contemporary meat industry. These groups cite studies showing the psychological damage caused by working in the meat industry, especially in factory and industrialised settings, and argue that the meat industry violates its labourers' human rights by assigning difficult and distressing tasks without adequate counselling, training and debriefing. However, the working conditions of agricultural workers as a whole, particularly non-permanent workers, remain poor and well below conditions prevailing in other economic sectors. Accidents, including pesticide poisoning, among farmers and plantation workers contribute to increased health risks, including increased mortality. According to the International Labour Organization, agriculture is one of the three most dangerous jobs in the world.

Economics and diet
Similar to environmental vegetarianism is the concept of economic vegetarianism. An economic vegetarian is someone who practices vegetarianism from either the philosophical viewpoint concerning issues such as public health and curbing world starvation, the belief that the consumption of meat is economically unsound, part of a conscious simple living strategy or just out of necessity. According to the Worldwatch Institute, "Massive reductions in meat consumption in industrial nations will ease their health care burden while improving public health; declining livestock herds will take pressure off rangelands and grainlands, allowing the agricultural resource base to rejuvenate. As populations grow, lowering meat consumption worldwide will allow more efficient use of declining per capita land and water resources, while at the same time making grain more affordable to the world's chronically hungry." According to estimates in 2016, adoption of vegetarianism would contribute substantially to global healthcare and environmental savings.

Demographics
Prejudice researcher Gordon Hodson argues that vegetarians and vegans frequently face discrimination where eating meat is held as a cultural norm.

Turnover
Research suggests that, at least in the United States, vegetarianism has a high turnover rate, with less than 20% of adopters persisting for more than a year. Research shows that lacking social support contributes to lapses. A 2019 analysis found that adhering to any kind of restricted diet (gluten-free, vegetarian, kosher, teetotal) was associated with feelings of loneliness and increased social isolation.

Vegetarians or vegans who adopted their diet abruptly might be more likely to eventually abandon it when compared to individuals adopting their diet gradually with incremental changes.

Country-specific information

The rate of vegetarianism by country varies substantially from relatively low levels in countries such as the Netherlands (5%) to more considerable levels in India (20–40%). Estimates for the number of vegetarians per country can be subject to methodological difficulties, as respondents may identify as vegetarian even if they include some meat in their diet, and thus some researchers suggest the percentage of vegetarians may be significantly overestimated.

Media
Vegetarianism is occasionally depicted in mass media. Some scholars have argued that mass media serves as a "source of information for individuals" interested in vegetarianism or veganism, while there are "increasing social sanctions against eating meat" Over time, societal attitudes of vegetarianism have changed, as have perceptions of vegetarianism in popular culture, leading to more "vegetarian sentiment." Even so, there are still existing "meat-based" food metaphors which infuse daily speech and those who are vegetarian and vegan are met with "acceptance, tolerance, or hostility" after they divulge they are vegetarian or vegan. Some writers, such as John L. Cunningham, editor of the Vegetarian Resource Group's newsletter, have argued for "more sympathetic vegetarian characters in the mass media".

Literature
In Western literature, vegetarianism, and topics that relate to it, have informed a "gamut of literary genres," whether literary fiction or those fictions focusing on utopias, dystopias, or apocalypses, with authors shaped by questions about human identity and "our relation to the environment," implicating vegetarianism and veganism. Others have pointed to the lack of "memorable characters" who are vegetarian. There are also vegetarian themes in horror fiction, science fiction and poetry. 

In 1818, Mary Shelley published the novel Frankenstein. Writer and animal rights advocate Carol J. Adams argued in her seminal book, The Sexual Politics of Meat that the unnamed creature in the novel was a vegetarian. She argued that the book was "indebted to the vegetarian climate" of its day and that vegetarianism is a major theme in the novel as a whole. She notes that the creature gives an "emotional speech" talking about its dietary principles, which makes it a "more sympathetic being" than others. She also said that it connected with Vegetarianism in the Romantic Era who believed that the Garden of Eden was meatless, rewrote the myth of Prometheus, the ideas of Jean-Jacques Rousseau, and feminist symbolism. Adams concludes that it is more likely that the "vegetarian revelations" in the novel are "silenced" due to the lack of a "framework into which we can assimilate them." Apart from Adams, scholar Suzanne Samples pointed to "gendered spaces of eating and consumption" within Victorian England which influenced literary characters of the time. This included works such as Alfred, Lord Tennyson's poem titled The Charge of the Light Brigade, Christina Rossetti's volume of poetry titled Goblin Market and Other Poems, Lewis Carroll's Alice's Adventures in Wonderland, Mary Seacole's autographical account titled Wonderful Adventures of Mrs. Seacole in Many Lands, and Anthony Trollope's novel titled Orley Farm. Samples also argued that vegetarianism in the Victorian era "presented a unique lifestyle choice that avoided meat but promoted an awareness of health," which initially was seen as rebellious but later became more normalized.

In Irene Clyde's 1909 feminist utopian novel, Beatrice the Sixteenth, Mary Hatherley accidentally travels through time, discovering a lost world, which is a postgender society named Armeria, with the inhabitants following a strict vegetarian diet, having ceased to slaughter animals for over a thousand years. Some reviewers of the book praised the vegetarianism of the Armerians. 

James Joyce's 1922 novel, Ulysees is said to have vegetarian themes. Scholar Peter Adkins argued that while Joyce was critical of the vegetarianism of George A.E. Russell, the novel engages with "questions of animal ethics through its portrayal of Ireland's cattle industry, animal slaughter and the cultural currency of meat," unlike some of his other novels. He also stated that the novel "historicizes and theorizes animal life and death," and that it demonstrates the ways that symbolism and materiality of meat are "co-opted within patriarchal political structures," putting it in the same space as theorists like Carol J. Adams, Donna J. Haraway, Laura Wright, and Cary Wolfe, and writers such as J. M. Coetzee.

In 1997, S. Reneé Wheeler wrote in the Vegetarian Journal, saying that "finding books with vegetarian themes" is important for helping children "feel legitimate in being vegetarian." In 2004, writer J. M. Coetzee argued that since the "mode of consciousness of nonhuman species is quite different from human consciousness," it is hard for writers to realize this for animals, with a "temptation to project upon them feelings and thoughts that may belong only to our own human mind and heart," and stated that reviewers have ignored the presence of animals in his books. He also stated that animals are present in his "fiction either not at all or in a merely subsidiary role" because they occupy "a subsidiary place in our lives" and argued that it is not "possible to write about the inner lives of animals in any complex way." 

In 2012, Marla Rose published her book, Adventures of Vivian Sharpe, Vegan Superhero, which was praised for being an "authentic coming-of-age story" which exposes vegan youth to "teenage challenges". In 2014, The New Yorker published a short story by Jonathan Lethem titled "Pending Vegan" which follows "one family, a husband and wife and their four-year-old twin daughters" on a trip to SeaWorld in San Diego, California. The protagonist of the story, Paul Espeseth, renames himself "Pending Vegan" in order to acknowledge his "increasing uneasiness with the relationship between man and beast." 

In 2016, a three-part Korean novel by Han Kang titled The Vegetarian was published in the U.S., which focuses a woman named Young-hye, who "sees vegetarianism as a way of not inflicting harm on anything," with eating meat symbolizing human violence itself, and later identifies as a plant rather than as a human "and stops eating entirely." Some argued the book was 
more about mental illness than vegetarianism. Others compared it to fictional works by Margaret Atwood.

Television
Vegetarians, and vegetarian themes, have appeared in various TV shows, such as Buffy the Vampire Slayer, True Blood, The Simpsons, King of the Hill, and South Park. 

Spock  stands out. Said to be "television's first vegetarian," he and other Vulcans avoided eating meat due to a "philosophy of non-violence."" He is identified as vegetarian following an episode where he was "transported back to pre-civilised times" and ate meat. Richard Marranca, in an issue of the Vegetarian Journal, said that for Spock, like Kwai Chang Caine in Kung Fu, "vegetarianism was something authentic and taken for granted; it was the right thing to do based on compassion and logic."

In 1995, The Simpsons episode "Lisa the Vegetarian" aired. Before recording their lines for the episode, showrunner David Mirkin, who had recently stopped consuming meat, gave Linda and Paul McCartney "a container of his favorite turkey substitute," with both voicing characters in an episode which focused around vegetarianism. Critic Alan Siegel said that before the episode vegetarians had been portrayed as "rarely as anything but one-dimensional hippies" but that this episode was different as it was "told from the point of view of the person becoming a vegetarian." He said that the episode was one of the "first times on television that vegetarians saw an honest depiction of themselves" and of people's reaction to their dietary choices. The idea for the episode was originally proposed by David X. Cohen and the McCartneys agreed on the condition that Lisa remain a vegetarian, with both satisfied with how the episode turned out. In the episode, Lisa decides to stop eating meat after bonding with a lamb at a petting zoo. Her schoolmates and family members ridicule her for her beliefs, but with the help of Apu as well as Paul and Linda McCartney, she commits to vegetarianism. The staff promised that she would remain a vegetarian, resulting in one of the few permanent character changes made in the show. In an August 2020 interview, McCartney said that he and is wife were worried that Lisa "would be a vegetarian for a week, then Homer would persuade her to eat a hot dog," but were assured by the producers that she would remain that way, and he was delighted that they "kept their word." 

In September 1998, the King of the Hill episode "And They Call It Bobby Love" aired on FOX. In the episode, "Bobby has a relationship with a vegetarian named Marie. She later dumps him after he eats a steak in front of her. In the March 2002 South Park episode "Fun with Veal",  Stan Marsh becomes a vegetarian after he learns that veal is made of baby cows, with Cartman makes fun of. The episode ends with the boys, including Stan, getting grounded, but not before going out with their parents for burgers, meaning that Stan is no longer a vegetarian. In the DVD commentary, the creators said they wanted to balance their message of not eating baby animals, by at the same time not advocating people abstain from meat consumption altogether. 

Aang, in the animated series Avatar: The Last Airbender and The Legend of Korra was vegetarian. According to the show's creators, "Buddhism and Taoism have been huge inspirations behind the idea for Avatar." As shown in "The King of Omashu" and "The Headband", a notable aspect of Aang's character is his vegetarian diet, which is consistent with Buddhism, Hinduism, and Taoism. In the Brahmajala Sutra, a Buddhist code of ethics, vegetarianism is encouraged.

Other fictional characters who are vegetarians appears in other media. This includes Count Duckula in Count Duckula, Beast Boy in Teen Titans Go,  Lenore in Supernatural, and Norville "Shaggy" Rogers in the animated series What's New, Scooby Doo?. Before the latter animated series, Shaggy was known for having an "enormous appetite" earlier in the Scooby-Doo franchise. The decision to make Shaggy a vegetarian occurred after his voice actor, Casey Kasem, convinced the producers to do so, since he was a vegan who supported animal rights and opposed factory farming, saying he would refuse to voice Shaggy unless the character was vegetarian.

Also, a Netflix original, Okja, focused on vegetarianism, while a October 2019 South Park episode, "Let Them Eat Goo," featured a vegetarian character. Additionally, Steven Universe, the protagonist in the show Steven Universe and the limited epilogue series, Steven Universe Future, is a vegetarian. In the episode "Snow Day" of Steven Universe Future, Steven tells the Gems he lives with that he has been a vegetarian for a month, drinks protein shakes and mentions that he does "his own skincare routine."

Film
In the 1999 film, Notting Hill, Keziah, played by Emma Bernard is a vegetarian. In one scene, Keziah tells William "Will" Thacker (played by Hugh Grant), that she is a fruitarian. She says she believes that "fruits and vegetables have feeling," meaning she opposes cooking them, only eating things that have "actually fallen off a tree or bush" and that are dead already, leading to what some describe as a negative depiction. 

In the 2000 film, But I'm A Cheerleader, before Megan, one of the film's protagonists, is sent to a conversion therapy camp, her parents and others claim she is a lesbian because she is a vegetarian. Legally Blonde, a 2001 film, also featured a vegetarian. When Elle Wood introduces herself at Harvard Law School, she describes herself and her dog as "Gemini vegetarians."

In the 2018 Hollywood blockbuster, Black Panther, M’Baku (voiced by Winston Duke), the Jabari tribe leader who lives in the mountains of Wakanda, declares to a White CIA agent named Everett Ross (voiced by Martin Freeman), "if you say one more word, I’ll feed you to my children!" After Everett is shaken by these words, he jokes, saying he is kidding because all those in his tribe, including himself, are vegetarians. Some praised this scene for challenging a stereotype of Black culture and the perception of what vegetarians look like. Duke later said that some Black outlets cooked vegan meals for him, and said that the scene is "kind of teaching kids that eating vegetables is cool," which is something he is for. 

Vegetarian themes have also been noted in the Twilight novel (2005–2008) and film franchise (2008–2012), The Road (2006) and The Year of the Flood (2009). In March 2020, scholar Nathan Poirer reviewed Thinking Veganism in Literature and Culture: Towards a Vegan Theory, a book edited by Emelia Quinn and Benjamin Westwood, and he concluded that veganism could "infiltrate popular culture without being perceived as threatening," while noting others who contribute to the book examining vegan cinema that "challenges the normality of human supremacy by situating humans as potential prey," and stating that the essays outline ways veganism can be successful in popular culture. 

Other scholars noted vegetarian themes in the films The Fault in Our Stars, The Princess Diaries series, and the 2009 film, Vegetarian.

Video games
When it comes to video games, Bryce the Cow in Steer Madness is perhaps one of the most prominent vegetarian characters. In this animal rights inspired action-adventure game, the player assumes the role of Bryce the Cow, a walking, talking bovine determined to put an end to animal exploitation and turn everyone vegetarian. During gameplay, the player goes on a series of missions to save the animals using many different tactics. The game is based in an open city environment and features several transportation methods, with gameplay similar to the game Grand Theft Auto III (without the guns or violence), and was given a PETA award.

See also

 List of vegetarians
 Plant-based diet
 Vegetarian Diet Pyramid
 Vegetarian nutrition

References

 

Diets
Applied ethics
Intentional living
Nonviolence